Marc Rivière is a French director, actor and screenwriter. He has worked extensively in French television. He directed the 2009 historic television drama La reine et le cardinal set during the early years of the reign of Louis XIV of France.

Filmography

References

External links

Living people
French film directors
French male film actors
Year of birth missing (living people)